Sabir Shaikh was an Indian politician. He was a leader of Shiv Sena and a former cabinet minister in the Government of Maharashtra. He was elected to Maharashtra Legislative Assembly in 1999 from Ambernath constituency. He held Labour and Employment  portfolio. Shaikh died on 15 October 2014, after a prolonged illness. He was Muslim face of Shiv Sena and close aide of Balasaheb Thackeray.

Positions held
 1990: Elected to Maharashtra Legislative Assembly (1st term)
 1995: Re-elected to Maharashtra Legislative Assembly (2nd term)
 1995: Cabinet Minister of Labour and Employment, Maharashtra
 1999: Re-elected to Maharashtra Legislative Assembly (3rd term)

See also
 Manohar Joshi ministry
 Narayan Rane ministry

References

External links
 Shiv Sena Official website

2014 deaths
Maharashtra MLAs 1995–1999
State cabinet ministers of Maharashtra
People from Buldhana district
Year of birth missing
Maharashtra MLAs 1990–1995
Maharashtra MLAs 1999–2004
People from Latur
Marathi politicians
Shiv Sena politicians